Menoio is a village in Álava, Basque Country, Spain. Menoio or Menoyo is one of the 24 villages that make up the current municipality of Ayala (Álava). It is located on the mountain of the same name of 502 meters of height, located between the mountains Eskoritas (Eskorieta) and Peregaina, although the town is somewhat lower, at 466 meters of altitude. Its extension is 409 hectares, 32 areas and 50 centiares. 

The town is grouped in a single area in which several neighborhoods are distinguished: Barrutxi, Butarte, the countryside, Mendia, the Pico and the square. In the past there was another neighborhood in the foothills of Mount Eskoritas, of which there is only the hermitage of Our Lady of Etxaurren, which gave the district its name. In 2015 its population is 33 inhabitants.

The first data that speaks to us of human presence in the jurisdictional term of Menoio go back to the prehistory with the dolmen of the camps of Oletar, megalithic Monument of the year 2,500 before Christ, which was discovered in 1919. 

But apart from this fact, the history of Menoio goes back to at least 900 years. The oldest documentary evidence about its existence is of the year 1114 in which it appears as a witness and guarantor of the donation of the monastery of Obaldia (Madaria) to San Millán de la Cogolla a certain Alvar López de Menoyo. 

Among the outstanding buildings are the Hermitage of Etxaurren and the palace of Santa Casilda, as well as a medieval tower located in the center of the village.

Populated places in Álava